McCormick Road may refer to:

McCormick Road (Hunt Valley)
McCormick Road (Baltimore Light Rail station)